St Matthew's Church, Stalling Busk is a Grade II listed parish church in the Church of England in Stalling Busk, North Yorkshire.

History

The church was commissioned by the Rev Frederick Squibb in 1906, to replace the seventeenth century church. Building work started in 1908 and the church was dedicated in October 1909. The architect was Thomas Gerard Davidson and the church is built in an Arts and Crafts style.

Parish status

The church is in a joint parish with 
St Oswald's Church, Askrigg
St Margaret's Church, Hawes
St Mary and St John's Church, Hardraw

References

Church of England church buildings in North Yorkshire
Grade II listed churches in North Yorkshire
Churches completed in 1909
Arts and Crafts architecture in England